8th & Pine is a St. Louis MetroLink subway station. It is one of three stations to have an escalator system, with the other two being Convention Center and Lambert Airport Terminal 1. This station is located in downtown St. Louis and primarily serves the Central Business District, its residents, and commuters. There is a MetroStore located above the station at 801 Pine Street where tickets, passes and Metro branded gear can be purchased.

The station was built within the historic St. Louis Freight Tunnel that originally opened in 1874. Built to carry train traffic between the Eads Bridge and the Mill Creek Valley rail yards, it saw its last train (Amtrak) in 1974. Renovation of the tunnels began in 1991 to prepare them for the opening of MetroLink in 1993.

On January 20, 2023, Metro Transit announced that 8th & Pine would undergo a full rehabilitation. These improvements include updating elevator, escalator and stair access, lighting upgrades, improved signage and way-finding, a deep cleaning, and general infrastructure upgrades like new walls and flooring.

Station layout
The station's westbound platform is accessed via an entrance in the base of the data center building at the former AT&T Center in addition to a set of subway stairs on Pine Street.  The eastbound platform is accessed via an entrance in the base of the Laclede Gas Building and a set of subway stairs on 8th Street near Chestnut Street.

References

External links
 
 St. Louis Metro
Pine Street entrance from Google Maps Street View

MetroLink stations in St. Louis
Railway stations in the United States opened in 1993
Red Line (St. Louis MetroLink)
Blue Line (St. Louis MetroLink)
Railway stations located underground in Missouri